Defending champion John McEnroe defeated Jimmy Connors in the final, 6–1, 6–1, 6–2 to win the gentlemen's singles tennis title at the 1984 Wimbledon Championships. It was his third Wimbledon and sixth major singles title overall. The final was for a long time referred to as the greatest display in the history of tennis; it lasted only 80 minutes and McEnroe made just four unforced errors during the entire match (none in the first set).

This was the first major appearance for future six-time champion Boris Becker; he would go on to win the title the following year.

Seeds

  John McEnroe (champion)
  Ivan Lendl (semifinals)
  Jimmy Connors (final)
  Mats Wilander (second round)
  Jimmy Arias (fourth round)
  Andrés Gómez (quarterfinals)
  Yannick Noah (withdrew)
  José Luis Clerc (withdrew)
  Henrik Sundström (second round)
  Anders Järryd (first round)
  Kevin Curren (fourth round)
  Johan Kriek (fourth round)
  Tomáš Šmíd (quarterfinals)
  Bill Scanlon (fourth round)
  Vitas Gerulaitis (fourth round)
  Tim Mayotte (fourth round)

Yannick Noah and José Luis Clerc withdrew due to injury and illness respectively. They were replaced in the draw by Qualifier Paul Annacone and Lucky loser Claudio Mezzadri respectively.

Qualifying

Draw

Finals

Top half

Section 1

Section 2

Section 3

Section 4

Bottom half

Section 5

Section 6

Section 7

Section 8

References

External links

 1984 Wimbledon Championships – Men's draws and results at the International Tennis Federation

Men's Singles
Wimbledon Championship by year – Men's singles